This is part of a list of students of music, organized by teacher.

R

Alexander Raab

Sergei Rachmaninoff

Philip Radcliffe

Robert Radeke

Jean-Théodore Radoux

Priaulx Rainier

Joachim Raff

Jean-Philippe Rameau

Günther Ramin

James K. Randall

Alberto Randegger

Sopranos

Mezzo-sopranos

Contraltos

Tenors

Baritones

Basses

Bernard Rands

Agosto Rattenbach

Felix Rault

Einojuhani Rautavaara

Venanzio Rauzzini

Ernest Read

Maurice Ravel

Gardner Read

Napoléon Henri Reber

Janine Reding

Mark Richman

Max Reger

Willy Rehberg

Anton Reicha

Carl Reinecke

Fritz Reiner

N. M. Reingbald

Johann Georg Reinhardt

Alfred Reisenauer

Nadia Reisenberg

Ottorino Respighi

Jean de Reszke

José Rey de la Torre

Roger Reynolds

University of California, San Diego
, Associate Professor of Music, Stanford University
, Assistant Professor of Music, Wheaton College
, Signals and Noises, software development
, Composer, Chicago
, Composer and Conductor
, Associate Professor of Music, University of California, Santa Cruz
, Professor of Composition, University of Victoria School of Music

, Professor of Music, University of Rio del Sol, Porto Allegre, Brazil
, Assistant Professor of Electroacoustic Composition and Music Theory, University of Utah
, Walter Bigelow Rosen Professor of Music, Harvard University
, Composer, Director of Instrumental Arts Programs, California Institute of the Arts
, Director, The Paul Dresher Ensemble, Oakland, California
, Associate Professor, Yong Siew Toh Conservatory of Music (Singapore)
, Distinguished Professor, SUNY Buffalo

, Freelance Composer, San Diego
, Emmy-winning composer
, Post-doctoral Researcher, ACTOR Project, McGill University
, Head of Composition, Department of Music at University of Liverpool
, Lecturer, University of Limerick
, Associate Professor of Composition, Montclair State University
, Freelance Composer, Berlin
, Composer and Author
, Freelance cellist, composer, Ottawa
, Professor of Music, Mission College, Santa Clara, California
, Professor of Music and UCSC Porter College Provost, University of California, Santa Cruz
, Freelance Composer
, Associate Professor of Composition and Director of Intermedia Performance Lab, Stanford University
, Assistant Professor of Music, Southern Oregon University
, Distinguished Professor and Chair of the Division of Composition, University of North Texas
, Emeritus Professor of Music, University of Florida
, Composer, Finland
, Director and Professor, School of Music, Western Michigan University
, Freelance Composer, New York
, Music Director M.O.V.E. (Taipei)
, Professor of Conducting at the University of Southern California
, Associate Professor and Director of CEMI, University of North Texas
, Freelance musician, Köln, Germany
, Freelance composer, Tokyo
, Assistant Professor of Composition, Arizona State University
, Composer, Educator, Sound Artist, Portland, Oregon
, Dean of Iovine and Young Academy for Arts Technology and Innovation, University of Southern California 
, Senior Lecturer, Department of Music, Stanford University
, Assistant Professor of Composition, Sewanee, The University of the South 
, Composer, Assistant Professor, San Francisco State University
, Professor of Music Composition, Georgia State University
, Professor, Danville Community College, Virginia
, Instructor in Music, UC Irvine
, Associate of the Music Department, Harvard University
, Composer, Köln, Germany
, Director, Helsinki Biennale, Viitasaari, Finland
, Associate Professor of Music Composition and Technology, University of Colorado Boulder
, Head of Composition Studies and Music Technology, University of Western Australia
, Lecturer, Stanford University
, Professor of Music, École Nationale de Musique et de Danse d'Évry
, Freelance composer, Oslo, Norway
, Associate Dean, California Institute of the Arts, Los Angeles
, Program Manager for Educational Initiatives, Longy School of Music, Boston
, Instructor, Otterbein University
, Assistant Professor of Music, California State University, San Bernardino
, Associate Researcher, School of Future Design, Beijing Normal University

Yale (while visiting professor)
, Professor of Composition, University of Michigan
, Faculty member, NYU Steinhardt; Co-founder, Bang on a Can
, Co-Founder, Bang on a Can
, Professor and Vice Provost of the Arts, Duke University
, Professor of Music, San Diego State University

Josef Rheinberger

Ernst Richter

Franz Xaver Richter

Hans Richter

Allard de Ridder

Jaroslav Řídký

Carl Riedel

Wallingford Riegger

Hugo Riemann

Joseph Riepel

Ferdinand Ries

Vittorio Rieti

Julius Rietz

André-Jean Rigade

Wolfgang Rihm

Terry Riley

Stephen Francis Rimbault

Georgi Rimski-Korsakov

Nikolai Rimsky-Korsakov

Berthe Ringold

Christian Heinrich Rinck

Théodore Ritter

Achille Rivarde

Jean Rivier

Max Roach

Sylvio Robazzi

Richard Robert

 (aka Hugh Williams)

Sarah Robinson-Duff

Louise Robyn

George Rochberg

W. S. Rockstro

Pierre Rode

Johann Theodor Roemhildt

Jean Roger-Ducasse

Bernard Rogers

José Rolón

Bernhard Romberg

Count

Jesse Ronneau 

 Ann Cleare

Julius Röntgen

William Michael Rooke

Cyril Rootham

Cipriano de Rore

Ned Rorem

Bernard Rose

Leonard Rose

Thomas Roseingrave

Hilding Rosenberg

David Rosenboom

Jakob Rosenhain

Orla Rosenhoff

Moriz Rosenthal

Lauro Rossi

Walter Henry Rothwell

Christopher Rouse

Albert Roussel

Pietro Rovelli

Edwin Roxburgh

Nicolas Roze

Alexsander Różycki

Edmund Rubbra

Anton Rubinstein

Arthur Rubinstein

Nikolai Rubinstein

Dane Rudhyar

Ernst Rudorff

Josef Rufer

Johann Rufinatscha

Francesco Ruggi

Carl Friedrich Rungenhagen

William Russo

Wilhelm Karl Rust

Ferdinando Rutini

S

Kaija Saariaho

Boris Sabaneyev

Leonid Sabaneyev

Antonio Sacchini

Vasily Safonov

Camille Saint-Saëns

Nicola Sala

Michele Saladino

Charles Kensington Salaman

Baltasar Saldoni

Ney Salgado

Antonio Salieri

Thomas Salignac

Aulis Sallinen

Johann Peter Salomon

Giovanni Salvatore

Carlos Salzedo

Felix Salzer

Leon Sametini

Giovanni Battista Sammartini

Marcel Samuel-Rousseau

Cesare de Sanctis

György Sándor

Alfredo Sangiorgi

Pedro Sanjuan

Domingo Santa Cruz

Giuseppe Santarelli

Cláudio Santoro

Pablo de Sarasate

Giuseppe Saratelli

Giuseppe Sarti

Erik Satie

Emil von Sauer

Gordon Saunders

Émile Sauret

Eugène Sauzay

Marie Gabriel Augustin Savard

Georges Savaria

Robert Saxton

Giovanni Sbriglia

Marco Scacchi

Rosario Scalero

 (1913–1988)
 (1910–1981)

 (1922–2009)
 (1900–1963)

 (1922–1987)

 (1911–1995)
 (1911–2007)
 (1918–2005)
 (b. 1923)
 (1911–1979)
 (1918–2006)

 (born 1922)
 (1903-1990)
 (1912–1997)
 (born 1932)

Alessandro Scarlatti

Domenico Scarlatti

Bogusław Schaeffer

Pierre Schaeffer

Christoph Schaffrath

Philipp Scharwenka

Xaver Scharwenka

Edna Gockel-Gussen
Benjamin Guckenberger

Heinrich Scheidemann

Johann Schelle

Johann Baptist Schenk

Heinrich Schenker

Hermann Scherchen

Arnold Schering

Johann Gottfried Schicht

Poul Schierbeck

 (1913–2004)
 (1919–2001)
 (1922–2001)

Madeline Schiller

Joseph Schillinger

Max von Schillings

Anton Schindler

Philipp Schindlöker

Victor Schiøler

Henry Schmidt

Aloys Schmitt

Hans Schmitt

Artur Schnabel

Friedrich Schneider

Johann Gottlob Schneider

Arnold Schoenberg

Bernhard Scholz

Anna Eugénie Schön-René

Barry Schrader

Henry Schradieck

Franz Schreker

Johann Samuel Schroeter

Christoph Gottlieb Schröter

Edmund Schuëcker

Julius Schulhoff

Gunther Schuller

Johann Abraham Peter Schulz

William Schuman

Clara Schumann

Robert Schumann

Ignaz Schuppanzigh

Heinrich Schütz

Heinrich Schütz, often called the "father of German music", composer of what is traditionally regarded as the "first German opera" Dafne (1627, lost), and transmitter of the Italian style of his teacher Giovanni Gabrieli to Germany had many pupils, including many of the musicians who sang or played under him as Kapellmeister in composition.

, Schütz' cousin

, childhood friend of Schütz
Princess 

, father of:

Joseph Schwantner

Heinrich Schwemmer

Christian Friedrich Gottlieb Schwenke

Salvatore Sciarrino

Peter Sculthorpe

Friedrich Schwindl

Gregorio Sciroli

Alexander Scriabin

Humphrey Searle

Simon Sechter

Jan Sedivka

William Charles Ernest Seeboeck

Charles Seeger

Josef Seger

Mátyás Seiber

Waldemar Seidel

Isidor Seiss

Bernhard Sekles

Thomas Selle

Marcella Sembrich

Daria Semegen

Blanche Selva 

 Jean Witkowski
 Emiliana de Zubeldía

Tullio Serafin

Rudolf Serkin

Paolo Serrao

John Serry Sr.

Stanisław Serwaczyński

Roger Sessions

Sir

Otakar Ševčík

Ignaz von Seyfried

Giovanni Sgambati

Ravi Shankar

Harold Shapero

Harvey Shapiro

Yuri Shaporin

Vissarion Shebalin

Jessie Shefrin

Harry Rowe Shelley

Bright Sheng

Roy Shepherd

Robert Sherlaw Johnson

Sukeyasu Shiba

Seymour Shifrin

Nelli Shkolnikova
Yuriy Bekker

Verdina Shlonsky

Dmitri Shostakovich

Leonard Shure

Boris Sibor

Jean Sibelius

Balthasar Siberer

Nikolai Sidelnikov

Murry Sidlin

 (at Tanglewood)
 (at Tanglewood)
 (at Tanglewood)
 (at Tanglewood)
 (at Tanglewood)

Elie Siegmeister

 (Pulitzer Prize winner)

 (clarinetist)
 (Grammy-winner)

Roberto Sierra

Kazimierz Sikorski

Alexander Siloti

Jean-Henri Simon

Giuseppe Simoni

Gardell Simons

Roman Simovych

Leonid Sintsev

Hans Sitt

František Zdeněk Skuherský

Ruth Slenczynska

Nicolas Slonimsky

Dmitri Smirnov

Leland Smith

Leo Smith

Alfredo Soffredini

Harvey Sollberger

Solomon

Nicolai Soloviev

Giovanni Battista Somis

Enrique Soro

Leo Sowerby

 (Jack Benny's longtime music director)

Mathias Spahlinger

Philipp Spitta

Louis Spohr

Johann Staden

Maximilian Stadler

John Stainer

 
 
Sir

Camille-Marie Stamaty

Anton Stamitz

Johann Stamitz

Enrico Stancabiano

Charles Villiers Stanford

Herbert Hughes

Geoffrey Molyneux Palmer

 Stanley Herbert Wilson
 (who succeeded him as professor at Cambridge)
 Haydn Wood

Roman Statkowski

Bernhard Stavenhagen

Joseph Anton Steffan

Agostino Steffani

Daniel Steibelt

Eduard Stein

Leonard Stein

Emil Steinbach

Fritz Steinbach

Maximilian Steinberg

David Steinbrook

Wilhelm Stenhammar

Václav Štěpán

Constantin Sternberg

Eduard Steuermann

Bernard Stevens

Halsey Stevens

Robert Prescott Stewart

Elizabeth Stirling

Julius Stockhausen

Karlheinz Stockhausen

 (born Holger Schüring)

Gustave J. Stoeckel

Albert Stoessel

Eric Stokes

Josip Štolcer-Slavenski

Pyotr Stolyarsky

Benno Stolzenberg

Jaap Stotijn

 (:nl:Heinz Friesen)
 (:nl:Werner Herbers)
 (:nl:Haakon Stotijn)
 (:nl:Cees van der Kraan)
 (:nl:Koen van Slogteren)

Alan Stout

Veselin Stoyanov

Robert Strassburg

Richard Strauss

Igor Stravinsky

Edwin Stringham

Marco Stroppa

Gustav Strube

Steven Stucky

Made Subandi

Morton Subotnick

Josef Suk

Arthur Sullivan

Kenneth Sutherland

I Wayan Suweca

Hans Swarowsky

Jan Pieterszoon Sweelinck

Richard Swift

Bolesław Szabelski

Ferenc Szabó

Tadeusz Szeligowski

George Szell

Karol Szymanowski

References

Citations

Sources
 
 
 
 
 
 {{cite book|last=Highfill|first=Philip H.|year=1991|title=A Biographical Dictionary of Actors, Actresses, Musicians, Dancers, Managers, and Other Stage Personnel in London, 1660–1800: S. Siddons to Thynne|volume=14|publisher=SIU Press|isbn=978-0-8093-1526-0}}
 
 Hinson, Maurice (2001). Music for More than One Piano: An Annotated Guide. Indiana University Press. .
 Jones, Barrie; ed. (2014). The Hutchinson Concise Dictionary of Music. Routledge. .
 
 Mason, Daniel Gregory (1917). The Art of Music: A Comprehensive Library of Information for Music Lovers and Musicians. The National Society of Music. . ( Related books via Google).
 McGraw, Cameron (2001). Piano Duet Repertoire: Music Originally Written for One Piano, Four Hands. Indian University. .
 
 
 
 Sadie, Julie Anne & Samuel, Rhian; eds. (1994). The Norton/Grove Dictionary of Women Composers. W. W. Norton. .
  New Grove.
 

Further reading
 
 Wier, Albert Ernest (1938). Macmillan Encyclopedia of Music and Musicians''. Macmillan.

Students by teacher